Roderick MacLean (Scots Gaelic:Ruaidhri Mac Gill-Eathain) was a 16th-century Scottish bishop of the Isles. He was appointed as bishop on 5 March 1550 and died in 1553.

In Rome, in 1549, he published a Latin translation of a large portion of Adomnan of Iona's 'Life of St Columba, which was a very obscure text at the time.

Notes

Bishops of the Isles
16th-century Scottish Roman Catholic bishops
1553 deaths